Metro Sports Center is a multi-purpose athletic facility located in Evansville, Indiana. The facility has one turfed  walled indoor soccer field, fine volleyball court, oel, multi-sport court for volleyball, basketball, dodgeball, roller derby or floor hockey. There is also a private room for parties and meetings and two tenant spaces upstairs. Metro provides a climate controlled area for youth and adult sports programs, youth and adult parties as well as time slots for facility rentals.

Current programs
Volley Kids: 1st-2nd grade. This is an instructional program that meets once per week to teach the basics volleyball skills and an understanding of the game that prepares players for the league that is offered from 3rd grade through high school.

Youth Volleyball League: 3rd-12th grade. This is an instructional league that had 5 sessions running year round. Players practice one per week and play games one per week. Coaches work on age-appropriate skill development with the players, and help them to correctly apply their skills in games.

Metro Volleyball Club: This is a competitive, travel program that has teams ranging from regional competitors all the way up to national-qualifying teams that travel extensively. Club season generally runs from tryouts in mid to late October until late spring, depending on the travel level of the team.

Soccer Tikes: Ages 18months - 4 years. Tikes is an 8-week program that is offered year round. This program introduces very basic soccer skills, as well as working on gross motor coordination, listening skills, peer interaction and most importantly fun.

Youth Soccer: Ages 5–14. Youth Soccer runs year round in 7 week sessions. This is a very instructional league that starts with introducing the basic concepts of game play as well as developing individual skills. Players meet to up to twice per week for practice and once per week for games. Practices are designed to improve each player's foot skills and understanding of the game at their own pace and level.

High School Coed and High School Competitive League: These leagues are offered generally November–February and players participate in games once per week for an 8-week session.

Adult Soccer:  Metro currently offers both recreational and competitive coed leagues and men's leagues year round. Leagues are 8 weeks in length.

Summer, Winter Break and Spring Break Camps: Ages 5–12. Metro offers full-day sports camps for Summer, Spring and Winter Breaks. Campers will play a variety of sports each day as well as other activities depending on the age group of the camper. Camp hours are 8am-4pm with early drop off and late pick up available for no extra cost. Lunch and two snacks are provided, and sibling discounts are available.

See also
Sports in Evansville

References

External links
Metro Sports Center website

Parks in Southwestern Indiana
Sports venues in Evansville, Indiana
Soccer venues in Indiana